Neomicropteryx is a genus of small primitive metallic moths in the family Micropterigidae.

Species
Neomicropteryx bifurca Issiki, 1953 
Neomicropteryx cornuta Issiki, 1953 
Neomicropteryx elongata Issiki, 1953 
Neomicropteryx kazusana Hashimoto, 1992
Neomicropteryx kiwana Hashimoto, 2006
Neomicropteryx matsumurana Issiki, 1931 
Neomicropteryx nipponensis Issiki, 1931
Neomicropteryx redacta Hashimoto, 2006

Former Species
Neomicropteryx nudata Issiki, 1953

References

Micropterigidae
Moth genera